is a Japanese politician and member of the House of Representatives, representing the Tokyo 15th district in the House of Representatives.

Kakizawa was born in Brussels while his father Koji Kakizawa was stationed overseas with the Ministry of Finance. He grew up in Tokyo, attending Azabu High School and the University of Tokyo. He worked for NHK in Nagano from 1995 to 1999, during which time he worked on the broadcasting of the 1998 Winter Olympics. He resigned to work on his father's campaign in the 1999 gubernatorial election in Tokyo. Although the elder Kakizawa lost this race, he was elected to the House of Representatives in the 2000 election and the younger Kakizawa subsequently served as his assistant.

Kakizawa won a seat in the Tokyo metropolitan assembly in the 2001 election, campaigning to reduce the number of wards in Tokyo to twelve. He was reelected in the 2005 election as a member of the Democratic Party of Japan. In 2008, he was involved in a drunk driving accident and left the metropolitan assembly, spending the next year outside politics.

He joined Your Party in 2009 and stood as a candidate for the 15th district in the 2009 general election. He failed to win this seat but picked up a seat in the Tokyo proportional representation block. He won the 15th district seat in the 2012 general election. He left Your Party in August 2013, and later joined the new Yuinotoh party formed under Kenji Eda.

External links
Official website

1971 births
Living people
Members of the House of Representatives from Tokyo
Members of the Tokyo Metropolitan Assembly
Democratic Party of Japan politicians
Your Party politicians
University of Tokyo alumni
Unity Party (Japan) politicians
21st-century Japanese politicians